Chiu Ching-chun (born 8 December 1949) is a Taiwanese politician. He was the Magistrate of Hsinchu County since 20 December 2009 until 25 December 2018.

Education
Chiu obtained his bachelor's degree from Minghsin University of Science and Technology and master's degree in business administration from University of St. Thomas in the United States.

Hsinchu County magistracy

2009 county magistracy election
Chiu assumed the magistracy of Hsinchu County on 20 December 2009 after winning the 2009 magisterial election as the Kuomintang candidate on 5 December 2009.

2014 county magistracy election
In 2014, Chiu ran for reelection. He faced independent candidate Cheng Yung-chin, who had served as magistrate from 2001 to 2009. Chiu won the election.

2016 Mainland China visit
In September 2016, Chiu with another seven magistrates and mayors from Taiwan visited Beijing, which were Hsu Yao-chang (Magistrate of Miaoli County), Liu Cheng-ying (Magistrate of Lienchiang County), Yeh Hui-ching (Deputy Mayor of New Taipei City), Chen Chin-hu (Deputy Magistrate of Taitung County), Lin Ming-chen (Magistrate of Nantou County), Fu Kun-chi (Magistrate of Hualien County) and Wu Cherng-dean (Deputy Magistrate of Kinmen County). Their visit was aimed to reset and restart cross-strait relations after President Tsai Ing-wen took office on 20 May 2016. The eight local leaders reiterated their support of One-China policy under the 1992 consensus. They met with Taiwan Affairs Office Head Zhang Zhijun and Chairperson of the Chinese People's Political Consultative Conference Yu Zhengsheng.

References

External links

 

1949 births
Living people
Magistrates of Hsinchu County
Members of the 7th Legislative Yuan
Kuomintang Members of the Legislative Yuan in Taiwan
Members of the 4th Legislative Yuan
Members of the 5th Legislative Yuan
Members of the 6th Legislative Yuan
Hsinchu County Members of the Legislative Yuan
Taiwanese politicians of Hakka descent